Sport Newspapers was the British publishing firm responsible for the Daily Sport, Sunday Sport newspapers and a number of mid shelf and top shelf magazine titles, such as Adult Sport, Sport Babes, Sport Reader's Wives and Ladsmag. It was founded in 1986 by David Sullivan, to launch the newspaper Sunday Sport. The company offices were in Manchester, England.

An attempt was made to publish a weekly version in Ireland, called the Irish Weekly Sport, but its softcore pornography and trivial content proved unpopular within the Republic.

Subsidiaries
Subsidiaries to Sport Newspapers include Flip Media which was set up by Michael Bancroft, a former director of SMD Publishing to publish Front magazine and DVD World.

Administration
On 1 April 2011, the holding company for the firm, Sport Media Group Plc, announced that it had ceased trading, and the company was broken up by administrators.

Successors
Sullivan acquired the rights to some of Sport newspapers and now publishes the Midweek Sport (Wednesdays), Weekend Sport (Fridays) and Sunday Sport, through his new company (also based in Manchester) Sunday Sport (2011) Limited.

Entrepreneur Grant Miller acquired the rights to the Daily Sport and relaunched it online through a new company, Daily Sport Limited.

Sport Newspapers Limited and majority executive shareholder Duncan Williams is today primarily focused on developing realtime digital media brands, most particularly within the betting and gaming sector.

See also
Sunday Sport
Daily Sport
David Sullivan

References

External links
Sundaysport.com the official Sunday Sport, Midweek Sport and Weekend Sport website.
Dailysport.co.uk the official Daily Sport website.
Dailysport.mobi the official Daily Sport WAP site.

National newspapers published in the United Kingdom
Privately held companies of England
Defunct companies based in Manchester